RabbitEars is a website dedicated to providing information on over-the-air digital television in the United States, its territories and protectorates, and border areas of Canada and Mexico.  Aside from merely listing network affiliations and technical data, notations of stations carrying Descriptive Video Service, TVGOS, UpdateTV, Sezmi, Mobile DTV, and MediaFLO are also now covered on the site. RabbitEars also maintains a spreadsheet of current television stations.

RabbitEars.Info has been cited by The New York Times, The Washington Post, the Los Angeles Times, the Columbus Dispatch, and the Gotham Gazette for news stories, the Electric Pi Journal, CEOutlook, Sony's eSupport, and Crutchfield websites for additional technical information, and WCCB-TV, 
WOLO-TV, and WGHP television stations in relation to the digital television transition.

History of RabbitEars 

RabbitEars was developed as a replacement for 100000watts.com, which was a website started around 1998 by Chip Kelley. 100000watts started as a listing of every TV station in the US and grew in scope to eventually include AM and FM radio information as well. However, all information on that site, including technical data from the U.S. Federal Communications Commission (FCC), was hand-entered, and ultimately Kelley no longer had the time to dedicate to the website. Planning to shut the site down, Clear Channel/M Street Publications stepped in and purchased it in late 2002, after which it became subscription-only. It was at that time that Trip Ericson decided to develop a replacement.

After the digital television transition started in 2008, RabbitEars began tracking digital subchannels, Digital Transition Reports, and Analog Termination Requests made to the FCC. These pages were attached to an incomplete design that Ericson had begun to implement in 2004, but that had never been finished due to lack of coding knowledge. As the transition-related pages in particular received attention, corrections were sent to add to and correct the incomplete data that was kept on the rest of the site, and a notice was posted asking for additional assistance. On March 14, 2008, Bruce Myers joined the effort by creating an updated website design, and on April 14, 2008, RabbitEars launched in its current form.  Because of these circumstances, while the web address was registered in 2004, the 2008 date is considered to be the beginning of the organization.

RabbitEars Spreadsheet 

RabbitEars maintains a spreadsheet of DTV channels that includes information about stations such as their locations, call signs, network affiliations, channel, ERP, HAAT, and more for full-service DTV stations. The spreadsheet was originally hosted on AVSForum by Mike Mahan, who is better known as "Falcon_77", and was integrated into the RabbitEars project on July 29, 2008.

Data Included  

RabbitEars tracks stations that use Descriptive Video Service, TVGOS, UpdateTV, Mobile TV, Sezmi, and individual datacasts provided by local television stations in addition to providing lists of television station ownership, network affiliations, and some other miscellaneous information.  It covered the digital television transition extensively, and maintains a history of the transition. Also provided is continuing documentation of stations requesting different channels, as well as stations having problems with VHF transmission.

At the end of October 2009, the site added listings for Qualcomm's MediaFLO service, which has since gone defunct. In December 2009, the site also added listings for high powered transmitters Echostar would be using to launch its own mobile video service.  It is believed that the high-powered transmitters MediaFLO and Echostar use could result in overloading of preamplifiers used to boost television signals, and that these lists could help mitigate those concerns.

READS Ranks 

The RabbitEars Area Designation System (READS) Ranks were put together in 2008 in order to provide for a market ranking system without utilizing the proprietary Designated Market Area data, which is a registered service mark of Nielsen Media Research.  The READS Ranks are based solely on OTA signal coverage of American channels and do not take any demographic data into account. Also, for that reason, border Canadian markets, such as Toronto and Montreal (Canada's top markets), are included in the list, but rank close to the bottom of the list; most other Canadian markets, such as Edmonton, are not included, as American channels are not available over-the-air.

The READS list has been made available for use by anyone who wants to use them, with the only condition being that the ranks are not modified and still listed with the name "READS".

References

Referrals

External links 
 
READS Ranks

Digital television
Television websites
American websites
Internet properties established in 2008
2008 establishments in the United States